Baschurch is a civil parish in Shropshire, England.  It contains 54 listed buildings that are recorded in the National Heritage List for England.  Of these, four are listed at Grade II*, the middle of the three grades, and the others are at Grade II, the lowest grade.  The parish contains the scattered villages and smaller communities of Baschurch, Walford, Yeaton, Weston Lullingfields, Westoncommon, Petton, Stanwardine in the Fields, and Stanwardine in the Wood, and is otherwise rural.

Most of the listed buildings are houses, cottages, farmhouses and farm buildings, many of them are timber framed and date from the 17th century or before.  There are some larger houses that are listed, together with associated structures in their grounds.  Two churches are listed, with items in the churchyards, and other listed buildings include two bridges, a former toll house, a coffin-rest, a former pump house, and a milepost.  The Shrewsbury to Chester railway line passes through the parish, and the listed buildings associated with this are a station, a crossing-keeper's cottage, and a signal box.


Key

Buildings

References

Citations

Sources

Lists of buildings and structures in Shropshire